National Restoration Party may refer to:

National Restoration Party (Costa Rica)
National Restoration Party (Peru)
National Restoration Party (Zambia)